Charbagh or Chahar Bagh (chārbāgh,  chār bāgh, meaning "four gardens" in Persian) is a Persian and Indo-Persian quadrilateral garden layout based on the four gardens of Paradise mentioned in the Quran. The quadrilateral garden is divided by walkways or flowing water into four smaller parts. They are found in countries throughout Western Asia and South Asia, including Iran and India.

Persian garden concept of chahar bagh
The quadrilateral Charbagh concept is interpreted as the four gardens of Paradise mentioned in Chapter (Surah) 55, Ar-Rahman "The Beneficient", in the Qur'an:

One of the hallmarks of Charbagh garden is the four-part garden laid out with axial paths that intersect at the garden's centre. This highly structured geometrical scheme, called the chahar bagh, became a powerful method for the organization and domestication of the landscape, itself a symbol of political territory.

The concept of chahar bagh is not only mentioned in Qur'an but it has been mentioned in (Genesis 2: 8-10), the idea of the world divided into four parts.

Famous Charbagh gardens

The Chahrbagh-e Abbasi (or Charbagh Avenue) in Isfahan, Iran, built by Shah Abbas the Great in 1596, and the garden of the Taj Mahal in India are the most famous examples of this style. In the Charbagh at the Taj Mahal, each of the four parts contains sixteen flower beds.

In India, the Char Bagh concept in imperial mausoleums is seen in Humayun's Tomb in Delhi in a monumental scale. Humayan's father was the Central Asian Conqueror Babur who succeeded in laying the basis for the Mughal dynasty in the Indian Subcontinent and became the first Mughal emperor. The tradition of paradise garden brought to India by the Mughals, originally from Central Asia, which is found at Babur's tomb, Bagh-e Babur, in Kabul.

This tradition gave birth to the Mughal gardens design and displayed its high form in the Taj Mahal – built by Mughal emperor Shah Jahan, the great, great, grandson of the Central Asian Conqueror Babur, as a tomb for his favourite Indian wife Mumtaz Mahal, in Agra, India. Unlike most such tombs, the mausoleum is not in the centre of the garden, however archaeological excavations have revealed another garden opposite indicating that historically the mausoleum was centered as in tomb garden tradition.

Contemporary
A charbagh is located on the roof top of the Ismaili Centre in South Kensington, London.

See also

Lucknow Charbagh railway station
Paradise garden

References

Further reading
 Lehrman, Jonas Benzion (1980). Earthly paradise: garden and courtyard in Islam. University of California Press. .
 Ruggles, D. Fairchild (2008). Islamic Gardens and Landscapes. University of Pennsylvania Press. .
https://villanews.ir/en/editorial/when-everything-starts-with-chahar-bagh

External links

 Babur's Garden - video from the Asia Society, US

Persian art

Types of garden
Landscape design history
Mughal architecture elements
Persian words and phrases
Islamic architectural elements
Islamic gardens